Markleysburg is a borough in Fayette County, Pennsylvania, United States. The population was 246 at the 2020 census. The borough is served by the Uniontown Area School District.

Geography
Markleysburg is located in southeastern Fayette County at  (39.737178, 79.452646). Pennsylvania Route 281 passes through the borough as Main Street; it leads north  to U.S. Route 40 (the National Pike) and southwest  to the West Virginia border.

Demographics

As of the census of 2000, there were 282 people, 90 households, and 68 families residing in the borough. The population density was 989.3 people per square mile (375.5/km2). There were 105 housing units at an average density of 368.3 per square mile (139.8/km2). The racial makeup of the borough was 98.23% White and 1.77% African American.

There were 90 households, out of which 33.3% had children under the age of 18 living with them, 64.4% were married couples living together, 6.7% had a female householder with no husband present, and 24.4% were non-families. 23.3% of all households were made up of individuals, and 14.4% had someone living alone who was 65 years of age or older. The average household size was 2.60 and the average family size was 3.10.

In the borough the population was spread out, with 23.8% under the age of 18, 5.0% from 18 to 24, 21.6% from 25 to 44, 20.2% from 45 to 64, and 29.4% who were 65 years of age or older. The median age was 45 years. For every 100 females, there were 91.8 males. For every 100 females age 18 and over, there were 87.0 males.

The median income for a household in the borough was $22,083, and the median income for a family was $29,063. Males had a median income of $25,000 versus $15,625 for females. The per capita income for the borough was $12,312. About 21.3% of families and 21.5% of the population were below the poverty line, including 31.7% of those under the age of eighteen and 16.3% of those sixty five or over.

References

External links
 
 Markleysburg borough website

Populated places established in 1860
Pittsburgh metropolitan area
Boroughs in Fayette County, Pennsylvania
1860 establishments in Pennsylvania